Oil Blue 35 is a blue anthraquinone dye used for colouring alcoholic and hydrocarbon based solvents, including oils, fats, and waxes. It is used also in lacquers and inks. In some countries, it is used as a fuel dye. It is also used in some blue colored smoke formulations. In microscopy, it is used as a staining dye. When exposed to 5% hydrochloric acid solution, it becomes dirty green.

See also
 Oil Blue A

References

Staining dyes
Sudan dyes
Fuel dyes
Anthraquinone dyes
Aromatic amines
Butyl compounds